Carex trifida, the mutton-bird sedge, is a species of flowering plant in the family Cyperaceae, native to Macquarie Island of Australia, the South Island, the Antipodes Islands, and the Chatham Islands of New Zealand, southern Chile, and the Falkland Islands. There are a number of cultivars, including 'Rekohu Sunrise', 'Glauca', and 'Chatham Blue'.

References

trifida
Flora of Macquarie Island
Flora of the South Island
Flora of the Antipodes Islands
Flora of the Chatham Islands
Flora of southern Chile
Flora of the Falkland Islands
Plants described in 1799
Taxa named by Antonio José Cavanilles